The Caucasian Riviera  is located along the eastern shores of the Black Sea under the Caucasus Mountains. It runs from Novorossiysk, Russia to Sarpi, Georgia. The area is divided into five regions, of which four (Adjara, Guria, Samegrelo, and Abkhazia) are located in Georgia, and one (the Black Sea coast of Krasnodar Krai) is in Russia. The coast is located on the same latitude as the French Riviera, the Italian Riviera, New York City and the Korean Peninsula.

History 

The Caucasian Riviera has been populated since ancient times. The region was known as Colchis in Classical antiquity.

It became a tourist destination in the late 19th century following its rise in popularity among Russian aristocrats. In Soviet times it was called the Soviet Riviera for its popularity as a tourist destination among the USSR's population. After the break up of the Soviet Union the Caucasian Riviera has lost its popularity because of the War in Abkhazia and the general economic instability in the region. Today the Eastern coast of the Black Sea witnesses its revival. Large significance may be given to Batumi's renovations and 2014 Winter Olympics held in Sochi.

Climate 

To the south of Tuapse the climate is humid subtropical because of the mountains rising more than 1000 meters above sea level. North of Tuapse, the average rainfall is  a year. Average sunshine is between 2200–2400 hours and only an average of 12 days during summer are rainy.

Economy 

The economy of the area is based on tourism, agriculture and transportation. Tourist season lasts from the middle of May to the middle of October. The major touristic centers are located in Adjara, Abkhazia and Sochi. There are three ski areas near the coast.

Agriculture is a significant part of the economy with a variety of vegetables, cereals and fruits grown in the area. Tea growing is common in the region, and the Caucasus Mountains are one of the northernmost areas of the world where tea is grown.

The Black Sea is also called the "dead sea" because there is no life below 200 meters. However, several species of fish can still be caught in the sea, so fishing forms a part of the region's economy.

Some of the area's important ports are Batumi, Poti, Sukhumi, Sochi, Tuapse and Novorossiysk.

Gallery

References 

Coasts of the Black Sea
Riviera
Georgian Black Sea coast
Southern Russia